Gheorghe Maftei (born 1 April 1955) is a Romanian weightlifter. He competed at the 1980 Summer Olympics and the 1984 Summer Olympics.

References

External links
 

1955 births
Living people
Romanian male weightlifters
Olympic weightlifters of Romania
Weightlifters at the 1980 Summer Olympics
Weightlifters at the 1984 Summer Olympics
People from Onești
20th-century Romanian people
21st-century Romanian people